The Ucayali Province is one of the eight provinces in the Loreto Region of Peru. It was created on October 13, 1900, by president Eduardo López de Romaña. Its territory is mostly flat except for the Ganso Azul mountain range in its eastern part.

Political division
The province is divided into six districts.

 Contamana (Contamana)
 Inahuaya (Inahuaya)
 Padre Marquez (Tiruntan)
 Pampa Hermosa (Pampa Hermosa)
 Sarayacu (Dos de Mayo)
 Vargas Guerra (Orellana)

References 
  Instituto Nacional de Estadística e Informática. Banco de Información Digital. Retrieved November 3, 2007.

Provinces of the Loreto Region